Evelyn Carmen Ramos (also referred to as E. Carmen Ramos) is the first woman and the first person of color to be the chief curatorial and conservation officer at the National Gallery of Art.

Education 
Ramos received a bachelor's degree in Art History and Psychology from New York University in 1988. In 1995, she went on to earn a Master's in art history from the University of Chicago. In 2011, she earned her PhD in art history also from the University of Chicago.

Career

Internships 
Ramos held internships at Art Institute of Chicago, Brooklyn Museum, Metropolitan Museum of Art, and was a fellow in the Smithsonian Latino Museum Studies Program. Ramos was a public programs educator at the Brooklyn Museum. She later worked at the Newark Museum of Art in New Jersey as an assistant curator.

Smithsonian 
Ramos joined the Smithsonian American Art Museum (SAAM) as the acting chief curator and curator of Latinx art in 2010 until her departure in 2021. At SAAM, she organized several different exhibits, including “Our America: The Latino Presence in American Art” in 2013, “Down These Mean Streets: Community and Place in Urban Photography” in 2017, “Tamayo: The New York Years" in 2017-18, and “¡Printing the Revolution! The Rise and Impact of Chicano Graphics, 1965 to Now” in 2021. During her time at SAAM, Ramos has doubled the Latinx collections.

The National Gallery of Art 
Ramos was appointed as chief curatorial and conservation officer at the National Gallery of Art on May 13, 2021. Ramos is the first woman and the first person of color to be the chief curatorial and conservation officer at the National Gallery of Art. She will begin her role in August 2021.

Resources 

New York University alumni
University of Chicago alumni
Dominican American
Museum educators
National Gallery of Art
American people of Dominican Republic descent
Smithsonian Institution people
American art curators
American women curators
Year of birth missing (living people)
Living people
21st-century American women